Carlos Humberto Ruiz Gutiérrez (born 15 September 1979), initially nicknamed El Pescadito or "The Little Fish" but later became El Pescado or "The Fish" (even by Spanish-speakers), is a Guatemalan former professional footballer who played as a striker. A product of CSD Municipal's youth academy, Ruiz has played for five MLS clubs (Los Angeles Galaxy, FC Dallas, Toronto FC, Philadelphia Union, and D.C. United), scoring 88 goals in 182 MLS regular-season matches and 16 goals in the post-season, which is the second most post-season goals in MLS history. In 2002, he was named the MLS's Most Valuable Player of the season.

He was a member of the Guatemalan national team from 1998 to 2016. He is regarded to be the greatest Guatemalan footballer of all time. He served as captain, is the player with the most caps and is the all-time top scorer of the Guatemala national team. He played in five World Cup qualification phases and in September 2016, he became the all-time top scorer in World Cup qualification with 39 goals, although his country never qualified for the tournament.

In 2019, Ruiz worked for a television channel in Miami.

Club career

Early career (1995–2002)
Ruiz, born in Guatemala City, Guatemala, started his footballing career in local club San Carlos. At the age of 12, he joined the youth divisions of Club Social y Deportivo CSD Municipal, and at 16, he made his professional debut. He became a starter for Municipal and a young star in the Guatemalan league until 2000, when he traveled to Europe to play for a short time alongside compatriot Guillermo Ramírez at Greek club PAS Giannina. After a stint with PAS, he returned to Municipal.

LA Galaxy (2002–2005)

In January 2002, Ruiz signed with the Los Angeles Galaxy. He was initially skeptical, telling The New York Times, "I didn't know anything about MLS or soccer in the U.S. Everything we hear about Major League Soccer is not so good ... we hear that all the players come here to finish their careers." However, he found the level to be better than he imagined, saying: "In the beginning, I was not happy to come here. But after a couple of games and when I see the level of soccer here, I was excited to play here." Once in MLS, Ruiz shone immediately. In his debut season in 2002, Ruiz scored 24 goals (winning the MLS Golden Boot), leading the Galaxy to the MLS Cup by scoring the 2nd golden goal in MLS Cup history, a year after Dwayne de Rosario was the first to accomplish the feat in 2001. He was named the MLS Most Valuable Player that year. In the playoffs, he scored eight goals and added two assists, totaling 18 points and setting an MLS record for goals and points in a single postseason. Ruiz' overtime goal in extra time of MLS Cup 2002 gave Galaxy the title.

In his second season, Ruiz cooled off significantly, but the forward still finished the season tied with Taylor Twellman for the league lead in goals with 15. He continued to statistically drop in 2004, scoring 11 goals. Ruiz had trials at English side Wolverhampton Wanderers in the 2003–04 season.

FC Dallas (2005–2007)
In 2005, when Landon Donovan expressed his desire to return to MLS, the Galaxy traded Ruiz to FC Dallas for the #1 allocation in the MLS pecking order, so that they could acquire Donovan. Ruiz finished his first year in Dallas with 11 goals and two assists. During the postseason in the conference semifinals, Ruiz scored two goals in the second leg match against the Colorado Rapids, but FC Dallas were eliminated on penalty kicks. In February 2006, MLS fully bought Ruiz's contract rights from his former club, Municipal, and FC Dallas was able to negotiate a multi-year deal. In March 2006, a bicycle kick goal he scored against D.C. United was selected as the "Goal of the Decade" in MLS through online voting.

During a 2007 game against the Houston Dynamo, Ruiz was involved in a controversial incident with Houston midfielder Ricardo Clark. Following a corner kick in which the two players became entangled, Clark violently kicked Ruiz in the upper body as he lay on the pitch hoping to draw a foul. Ruiz then hit Clark's back with his knee during the subsequent play, and both players were sent off, with Clark also receiving the longest suspension in league history.

Following the conclusion of the 2007 season, Ruiz appeared to be unwilling to return to Dallas and to be holding out for a move back to the Galaxy. Earlier attempts to produce a trade faltered due to Ruiz being a grandfathered Designated Player, with the Galaxy already having other players in the same situation (Landon Donovan and David Beckham). In January 2008, FC Dallas traded Ruiz to the Galaxy for an undisclosed cash allocation and the Galaxy's natural second-round pick in the following year's MLS SuperDraft. At his departure, he said, "I did everything I could to win a championship with Dallas. Unfortunately, it did not happen."

Return to LA Galaxy and trade to Toronto FC (2008)
He spoke about the Galaxy to ESPN analyst Andrea Canales: "I still think the Galaxy is the best team in the U.S. They're the best organization. The Galaxy have always had famous players. They continue to be a team that people always follow," and added his personal relief to be on the Galaxy team, "I'm so glad I came to the Galaxy and not another team, because I would have felt like I was starting over." In the season opener, however, Ruiz suffered a knee injury and was unable to play for over a month. While Ruiz was injured, the Galaxy found unexpected striking potential in Edson Buddle, and even after coming back from the injury, Ruiz was notably still left off the travel roster for a high-profile game against D.C. United. He scored his first goal of the 2008 season on 19 July in a game against New York Red Bulls.

Ruiz was traded on 19 August 2008 to Toronto FC who in-turn released Laurent Robert to make room for Ruiz. He was expected to help solve TFC's goal scoring woes as he had scored 82 goals in MLS at that point in his career, but he managed only five first team games in Toronto, during which he scored no goals. He was released by Toronto in early 2009 after they signed Dwayne De Rosario.

Olimpia (2009)
On 31 January 2009, Ruiz signed a contract with Paraguayan club Olimpia Asunción under the request of then-coach Ever Hugo Almeida. Ruiz and his compatriot Carlos Figueroa joined the club together. Both of the players were coached by Ever Hugo Almeida at CSD Municipal between 2001 and 2003. Ruiz joined Olimpia Asunción on a non-contract, but on the promise of signing a contract. Amongst Ruiz' most remembered goals, came in a 2–0 victory in the Paraguayan superclasico against Cerro Porteño and a free kick against 3 de Febrero. He also scored a hat trick against Rubio Ñu in a 5–3 victory for Olimpia. In total, Ruiz scored 10 goals in 18 appearances, becoming the team's leading goal scorer and the third leading goal scorer in the 2009 Torneo Apertura. Ruiz finished with Olimpia Asunción in June 2009. Ruiz departed the club before the 2009 Torneo Apertura finished. The decision of leaving Olimpia was because of the circumstances and was not his, as the club experienced it's worse administrative moment. Since departing Olimpia, Ruiz became friends with Denis Caniza, Mario Jara and Juan Lucero and remained in contact with them.

Puebla (2009–2010)
Ruiz signed with Puebla on 30 June 2009 under head coach José Luis Sánchez Solá. On 25 July 2009, in a game against Tigres, he scored his first goal for Puebla on a penalty kick. He wore number 20, which is the same number he previously wore for LA Galaxy, FC Dallas, and the Guatemala national team.

Aris FC (2010)
Ruiz agreed to join Aris FC on 12 July 2010. He made his debut on 18 August 2010 in the playoff round of the Europa League against Austria Wien, becoming the first Guatemalan footballer ever to appear in a UEFA competition match. The first leg was played in Thessaloniki with Ruiz netting on his debut to give Aris a 1–0 victory. In the second leg played in Vienna, Ruiz scored again in a 1–1 draw, giving Aris a 2–1 aggregate victory and sending them through to the group stage, where he scored one more goal against Rosenborg.

Philadelphia Union (2011)
After trialling with the club during the 2011 MLS pre-season, Ruiz signed with the Philadelphia Union on 22 February 2011. On 26 March he scored Philadelphia's winning goal in the home opener of the 2011 MLS season against the Vancouver Whitecaps FC. Ruiz also scored the "MLS Goal of the Week" in Week 10 of the season with a game-winning 35 yard strike against the Chicago Fire.

Veracruz (2011)
On 3 August 2011, Ruíz was transferred to Tiburones Rojos de Veracruz. He scored his first goal for the club against Correcaminos during the 4th week of the 2011 Apertura tournament and finished the year with six goals in five matches. Ruiz remained a part of the club until 2013, though he was inactive for nearly a year.

D.C. United (2013)
On 31 January 2013, Municipal announced that Ruiz would be rejoining the club. However, this move was cancelled after Veracruz refused to terminate Ruiz's contract. On 20 February 2013, DC United announced that the club had signed Ruiz via the MLS allocation process to a one-year deal. On 30 October 2013, DC United announced that they had declined the contract option on Ruiz.

Return to Guatemala (2014)
On 8 February 2014, Municipal announced that Ruiz would be rejoining the club. He signed an 18-month contract that made him the highest paid footballer ever in Central America.

Return to FC Dallas (2016) 
On 15 September 2016, FC Dallas announced that they had signed Ruiz for a second stint with the club.

International career
Overall, Ruiz has earned 133 caps and has scored 68 goals for his country. He has played in World Cup qualification campaigns for the FIFA World Cups of 2002, 2006, 2010, 2014, and 2018. He played his first international match on 11 November 1998, a friendly against Mexico, and scored his first goal against El Salvador at the 1999 UNCAF Nations Cup. Ruiz represented Guatemala at the 1999 Pan American Games. In 2000, as the Guatemala national futsal team had begun its development, Ruiz was selected, along with other 11-a-side football players, as part of the squad that competed at the 2000 Futsal World Championship, hosted by Guatemala. He scored one goal in the tournament.

After scoring eight goals in nine matches during the 2002 World Cup qualification campaign and already having a successful career in the MLS, Ruiz was the focal point of the Guatemalan team in qualifying for the 2006 FIFA World Cup, leading the team in scoring as they reached the final stage of the CONCACAF region. However, they would not qualify for the World Cup.

On 14 June 2008, Ruiz broke Juan Carlos Plata's all-time individual goal-scoring record for Guatemala by scoring four goals against Saint Lucia in Guatemala's 2010 World Cup qualification opening match. Ruiz had scored 39 goals, four more than Plata's total. Ruiz also became the first Guatemalan player to score four goals in a World Cup qualification match. On 10 September 2008, Ruiz scored two goals against Cuba in Guatemala's 2010 World Cup qualification in the 3rd match of the 3rd round of qualification of the CONCACAF region. Those two goals extended his all-time individual scoring record for Guatemala to 41 goals, six more than Plata's total.

On 9 February 2009, Ruiz announced his retirement from international football. However, on 4 January 2011, he stated that he was returning to international football, making the UNCAF 2011 championship to be held in Panama his first international tournament in two years. He then participated in the 2011 CONCACAF Gold Cup, scoring one goal against Grenada in the first round and another one against Mexico in the quarterfinals in a 2–1 defeat.

On 16 October 2012, Ruiz again announced his retirement from international competition after a 3–1 loss to the United States at Livestrong Sporting Park, which eliminated Guatemala from 2014 World Cup qualification. However, he would return to play for Guatemala again and became the second Guatemalan player to appear in five World Cup qualification processes (Juan Manuel Funes being the first) when he started in the second round of the 2018 World Cup qualification in their opening match against Bermuda. 

On September 6, 2016, Ruiz scored 5 goals against Saint Vincent and the Grenadines in his final farewell match for Guatemala.  This gave him a total of 39 goals in 47 qualifying games and made him the highest goalscorer of all-time, from any country, in FIFA World Cup qualification history.  Those 39 goals came against 14 different countries.  They include five against each of Costa Rica, Antigua and Barbuda, and Saint Vincent and the Grenadines.

International goals
Ruiz is the most prolific goal-scorer in the history of the Guatemalan national team with 68 goals in 133 matches.Correct as of 7 October 2016

Career statistics

Honours
Municipal
Liga Nacional de Guatemala: Clausura 2000, Clausura 2002

Los Angeles Galaxy
MLS Cup: 2002
Supporters' Shield(1): 2002

DC United
U.S. Open Cup: 2013

FC Dallas
Supporters' Shield: 2016
Individual
 All-time top goalscorer of FIFA World Cup qualification (39 goals)
 CONCACAF Gold Cup Top Goalscorer: 2005
 MLS MVP: 2002
 MLS Cup MVP: 2002
 MLS Golden Boot (24 goals): 2002
 MLS Golden Boot (tie) (15 goals): 2003
 MLS All-Star Game MVP: 2003

Other MLS achievements
Ruiz is currently the 11th all-time leading goal scorer in MLS history.  He is also the All-Time Leading Goal Scorer in MLS Playoff history with 16 goals in 17 games. He was also a nominee for the 2011 MLS All-Star Game.

See also
 List of men's footballers with 100 or more international caps
 List of men's footballers with 50 or more international goals
 List of top international football goalscorers by country

References

External links
 
 
 Detail of international appearances and goals – www.rsssf.com – by Luis Fernando Passo Alpuin, RSSSF

1979 births
Living people
Sportspeople from Guatemala City
Guatemalan footballers
Association football forwards
C.S.D. Municipal players
PAS Giannina F.C. players
LA Galaxy players
FC Dallas players
Toronto FC players
Club Olimpia footballers
Club Puebla players
Aris Thessaloniki F.C. players
Philadelphia Union players
C.D. Veracruz footballers
D.C. United players
Super League Greece players
Major League Soccer players
Major League Soccer All-Stars
Paraguayan Primera División players
Liga MX players
Footballers at the 1999 Pan American Games
Pan American Games competitors for Guatemala
Guatemala international footballers
2002 CONCACAF Gold Cup players
2003 UNCAF Nations Cup players
2003 CONCACAF Gold Cup players
2005 CONCACAF Gold Cup players
2007 CONCACAF Gold Cup players
2011 Copa Centroamericana players
2011 CONCACAF Gold Cup players
2014 Copa Centroamericana players
2015 CONCACAF Gold Cup players
FIFA Century Club
Guatemalan expatriate footballers
Guatemalan expatriate sportspeople in Greece
Guatemalan expatriate sportspeople in the United States
Guatemalan expatriate sportspeople in Canada
Guatemalan expatriate sportspeople in Paraguay
Guatemalan expatriate sportspeople in Mexico
Expatriate footballers in Greece
Expatriate soccer players in the United States
Expatriate soccer players in Canada
Expatriate footballers in Paraguay
Expatriate footballers in Mexico
Expatriate footballers in France